Bang Duan is a khwaeng (subdistrict) of Phasi Charoen District, in Bangkok, Thailand. In 2020, it had a total population of 28,156 people.

Its name "Bang Duan" is derived from the khlong Bang Duan, a canal runs through the area. 

Lert Suksom Community is a small community under the bridge over the Khlong Bang Khi Keng on Phutthamonthon Sai 1 Road. As a result of the construction of Phutthamonthon Sai 1 Road in 1997 through here, this community was also affected. The area around the community has become a wasteland and a dumping ground. Later in 2012, the community on both sides of the road joined with Siam University, turning the wasteland under the bridge into a vegetable garden plot. The dominant species is pandan.

It is also a very prominent community in terms of waste management, until receiving an award from BMA and considered as a model of their own community development of other communities.

References

Subdistricts of Bangkok
Phasi Charoen district